Guy Ipoua (born 14 January 1976) is a former Cameroonian footballer who played as a striker. He previously played for a string of British and Continental clubs. His elder brother, Samuel, represented Cameroon at the 1998 World Cup.

Career
Born in Douala, Cameroon, Ipoua moved to Strasbourg, France, at the age of four. His early football career is unclear but he joined AS Nancy in 1992, and had a spell at Torino where his brother was also on loan from Inter Milan, for six months. He was also on the books of Atlético Madrid, at the time the reigning La Liga champions and cup holders. He has also played for Sevilla, Alicante, Écija Balompié and Novelda.

In the summer of 1998, he spent three weeks on trial at Crystal Palace, but failed to secure a contract. He spent a season at Bristol Rovers where he scored 3 goals in 24 league games, before being released the following summer. A trial at Torquay United followed trial in July 1999, but he again failed to secure a contract. He subsequently went for trials at a number of clubs in England and Scotland, including Wycombe Wanderers and St Johnstone.

He eventually signed for Scunthorpe United in August 1999, scoring on his debut against AFC Bournemouth, and again against Cardiff City two days later. This earned him a contract with the club, and he enjoyed almost two successful seasons with Scunthorpe, notably scoring seven times in the space of a week. He was sold to Gillingham for just £25,000, a low fee because he could have left for free a couple months later under the Bosman ruling. He was mainly used as a substitute for Gillingham up to the end of the season.

After rejecting a possible move to the United States with FC Dallas, he joined Scottish side Livingston in July 2003, having missed a substantial amount of pre-season training. However, he was to make just two appearances for the club, both as a substitute.

In July 2004, Ipoua signed for Doncaster Rovers, but again failed to establish himself in the first team. He joined Mansfield Town on loan in October 2004 and Lincoln City on loan in February 2005 before being released at the end of the season.

In August 2005, he joined Hereford United and scored a goal in each of his first three league games. His season was disrupted by injury and in the latter stages he was used as only as a substitute. However, he shone in Hereford's successful play-off campaign, scoring an extra-time winner in the semi-final against Morecambe. In the final itself he was brought on in the second half with Hereford 2–1 down, and soon made an impact. He skillfully controlled a flick on by Andy Ferrell, played the ball out to Simon Travis and then powerfully headed the return cross into the net to equalise. In the dying minutes of extra time he also did well to run the clock down by keeping the ball in the corner while fending off the attentions of several opposing players and earning Hereford 3 consecutive corners. Unfortunately, Guy was one of several Hereford players released shortly after the final.

In August 2006, he signed for Forest Green Rovers after impressing on trial in pre season for the Gloucestershire club. Ipoua made his Forest Green debut on 26 August 2006 in a 1–0 defeat against Gravesend & Northfleet. After making just seven appearances, five of these from the bench, Ipoua was released in September 2006 and signed for Oryx Douala in his native Cameroon.

Post playing career
Ipoua joined the scouting team at Newcastle United in 2019.

References

1976 births
AS Nancy Lorraine players
Atlético Madrid footballers
Bristol Rovers F.C. players
Cameroonian footballers
Doncaster Rovers F.C. players
Forest Green Rovers F.C. players
Gillingham F.C. players
Hereford United F.C. players
La Liga players
Lincoln City F.C. players
Living people
Livingston F.C. players
Mansfield Town F.C. players
Scottish Premier League players
Scunthorpe United F.C. players
Sevilla FC players
Torino F.C. players
Alicante CF footballers
Cameroonian expatriate footballers
Expatriate footballers in France
Expatriate footballers in Italy
Expatriate footballers in Spain
Expatriate footballers in England
Expatriate footballers in Scotland
Association football forwards